Gudamalani is one of the 200 Legislative Assembly constituencies of Rajasthan state in India. It is in Barmer district and is a part of Barmer (Lok Sabha constituency).

List of MLA

Election results

2018

See also
List of constituencies of the Rajasthan Legislative Assembly
Barmer district

References

Assembly constituencies of Rajasthan
Barmer district